A double-disc recording of the alternative rock band Concrete Blonde performing live in Brazil in 2002.

Track listing
Disc 1:

"God Is a Bullet"
"Valentine"
"Tonight"
"Everybody Knows"
"The Vampire Song"
"Take Me Home"
"Little Conversations"
"Caroline"
"Joey"

Disc 2:

 "Days and Days"
 "I Was a Fool"
 "Violent"
 "Someday"
 "Scene of a Perfect Crime"
 "Your Haunted Head"
 "Roxy"
 "Mexican Moon"
 "Tomorrow, Wendy"

References

Concrete Blonde albums
2003 live albums